Marko Maletic may refer to:

Marko Maletić (footballer, born 1993), Bosnian-Herzegovinian footballer
Marko Maletic (soccer, born 1999), Canadian soccer player